Raymond Delacy Adams (February 13, 1911 – October 18, 2008)  was an American neurologist and neuropathologist. He was Bullard Professor of Neuropathology at Harvard Medical School and chief of neurology at Massachusetts General Hospital. Along with Maurice Victor, Adams was the author of Adams and Victor's Principles of Neurology.

Born near Portland, Oregon, Adams was the son of William Henry Adams and Eva Mabel Morriss. He graduated from the University of Oregon with a degree in Psychology. He received his M.D. from the Duke University School of Medicine in 1936. Adams became chief of neurology at Massachusetts General in 1951 retiring in 1977. Adams had an encyclopedic knowledge of adult neurology, pediatric neurology, and neuropathology and is widely regarded as a pre-eminent neurologist of the mid-20th century. He was elected a Fellow of the American Academy of Arts and Sciences in 1955. He helped found the Eunice Kennedy Shriver Center for Mental Retardation.

In 1949, together with Joseph Michael Foley he described negative myoclonus and in 1953 they coined the term asterixis. In 1963 the Australian neurologist James Waldo Lance described together with him the posthypoxic myoclonus later called Lance-Adams syndrome.  Adams, in collaboration with  Dr. C. Miller Fisher, made contributions to the field of cerebrovascular disease, the syndrome of "transient global amnesia", and in 1965 he published an article in the New England Journal of Medicine describing the syndrome of "normal pressure hydrocephalus". Adams also first described central pontine myelinolysis.

Adams died in Boston of complications from congestive heart failure, aged 97.

References

Further reading
 Laureno, Robert (2009). Raymond Adams: A Life of Mind and Muscle, Oxford University Press
 Adams RD, Fisher CM, Hakim S, et al., "Symptomatic Adult Hydrocephalus with Normal Cerebrospinal Fluid Pressure: A Treatable Syndrome", New England Journal of Medicine 1965; 273: 117–26.

1911 births
2008 deaths
American neurologists
Duke University School of Medicine alumni
Fellows of the American Academy of Arts and Sciences
Harvard Medical School faculty
Massachusetts General Hospital faculty
University of Oregon alumni
Scientists from Portland, Oregon